Lusiny  is a village in the administrative district of Gmina Bartoszyce, within Bartoszyce County, Warmian-Masurian Voivodeship, in northern Poland, close to the border with the Kaliningrad Oblast of Russia.

In early 1945 the entire male population was executed by the Soviet Army.

Notable residents
 Friedrich Tischler (1881-1945)

References

Lusiny